Shelter Island is an island in the Alexander Archipelago, southeast of Lincoln Island and northwest of Juneau, Alaska, U.S. It trends northwest between Favorite and Saginaw channels. It was named in 1869 by Commander R. W. Meade of the United States Navy. The first European to sight the island was Joseph Whidbey, master of  during George Vancouver's 1791–95 expedition, in 1794.

Gallery

References

Islands of the Alexander Archipelago
Islands of Juneau, Alaska
Islands of Alaska